Lass may refer to:
A girl/young woman in Scottish/Northern English

People

Surname
August Lass (1903–1962), Estonian footballer
Barbara Kwiatkowska-Lass (1940–1995), Polish actress
Donna Lass (1944– 1970), possible victim of the Zodiac Killer
Jakob Lass (born 1981), German film director, screenwriter, producer, and actor
Kadri-Ann Lass (born 1996), Estonian basketball player
Liis Lass (born 1989), Estonian actress
Martin Lass (born 1958), American violinist
Roger Lass (born 1937), American historical linguist
Yoram Lass (born 1945), Israeli physician, researcher, scientist, and politician

Other people
Lassana Diarra (also known as Lass; born 1985), French footballer
Lass Bangoura (born 1992), Guinean footballer
Lass Small (1923–2011), American romance novelist

Fictional characters
George Lass, television role on Dead Like Me
Lightning Lass (original name of Ayla Ranzz), super heroine in DC Comics universe
Shadow Lass, super heroine in DC Comics universe

Animals
   Horses
Cherry Lass (1902–1914), British racehorse
Richmond Lass (1963–1985), Australian harness racehorse
Wayward Lass (1978–2003), American racehorse

   Pigeons
Kenley Lass ( 1940), British war pigeon
Scotch Lass (died 1944), British carrier pigeon

Other
The Bonnie Lass o' Fyvie, a Scottish folk song
Solway Lass, an Australian two-master tall ship
Tullaghmurray Lass, a prawn fishing boat lost near Northern Ireland

Estonian-language surnames